Hamad Hamidi Al Harbi  is a Kuwaiti football forward who played for Kuwait in the 2004 Asian Cup. He also played for Al-Salmiya and Al Naser.
He started his career in 1997 with Al-Nasr Club and played his first match against Kazma at the age of seventeen and succeeded in scoring 13 goals in his first season (98/97). With Al-Nasr, he won the Al-Kharafi Revitalization Championship in 2000 and third place in the Crown Prince Cup competition.
He moved to Salmiya in 2005 for 15,000 Kuwaiti dinars on loan for two seasons, and scored two goals in his first match against Al Sahel in the Kharafi Championship and won with Salmiya third place in this tournament.
Harbi participated in the 2006 World Cup qualifiers for his country, scoring three goals.

External links

Kuwaiti footballers
Living people
1980 births
Association football forwards
Kuwait international footballers
Kuwait Premier League players
Kazma SC players
Al-Arabi SC (Kuwait) players
Al Salmiya SC players
Al-Nasr SC (Kuwait) players
Burgan SC managers
Al-Fahaheel FC players
Al-Sulaibikhat SC players
Al-Nahda Club (Oman) players
Kuwaiti expatriate footballers
Kuwaiti expatriate sportspeople in Oman